Ellen Riley Wright (24 December 1859 – 3 August 1904) was an English composer of music for popular songs.

Biography
Ellen Riley was born in London, the daughter of American engineer George Riley, and married an attorney. She began to compose with no instruction and published her first songs in 1891. Encouraged by her success, she studied harmony with Henry Gadsby and orchestration with Francis William Davenport and expanded her career as a composer.

Works
Her compositions include:

"Lovesight" (Text: Dante Gabriel Rossetti)
"Morgens send' ich dir die Veilchen" (Text: Heinrich Heine)
"Violets" (Text: Julian Fane after Heinrich Heine)
"She Walks in Beauty"
"Queen of My Days"
"Had I but Known"
"Love's Entreaty"
"The Dawn of Life," with orchestral accompaniment

References

1859 births
1904 deaths
19th-century classical composers
Women classical composers
English classical composers
19th-century English musicians
19th-century British composers
19th-century women composers